Major General Clift Andrus (October 12, 1890 – September 29, 1968) was a highly decorated senior officer of the United States Army. He is most noted for his service as a commander of 1st Infantry Division at the end of World War II.

In military circles, Andrus was widely known by his nickname, "Mr. Chips".

Early years
Clift Andrus was born on October 12, 1890 at Fort Leavenworth, Kansas as a son of army colonel, Edwin Proctor Andrus and his wife Marie Josephine (néé Birdwell). After attending a Shattuck-Saint Mary's in Faribault, Minnesota, Andrus began to study Civil Engineering at Cornell University as a member of the class of 1912.  He left college before graduating, and entered the army in spring of 1912 with a commission as a second lieutenant in the 4th Field Artillery Regiment.

Andrus served at Fort Leavenworth, Kansas and after three months was transferred to Fort Russell in Wyoming.

In 1914 and 1915, Andrus was assigned to the U.S.-Mexico border as part of the patrolling and security activities that preceded the Pancho Villa Expedition.

In 1915, Andrus was assigned to the Army Field Artillery School at Fort Sill for additional training.  He remained at Fort Sill as an instructor throughout World War I.

His post-war assignments included service in Trier with the Army of Occupation stationed in Germany following the Armistice, staff duty with the office of the Chief of Field Artillery, and observer and instructor with several units of the National Guard.

Andrus graduated from the Field Artillery Advanced Course in 1928, the United States Army Command and General Staff College in 1930, the United States Army War College in 1934, and the Naval War College in 1935.

Second World War
At the beginning of the World War II, Colonel Andrus was commander of the 24th Infantry Division Artillery at Schofield Barracks, Hawaii. In May 1942 he was promoted to brigadier general. Subsequently, he was transferred to the 1st Infantry Division under command of Terry de la Mesa Allen Sr., as commander of the Division Artillery.

Andrus participated with the 1st Infantry Division in several battles of the North African Campaign and was subsequently awarded the Distinguished Service Cross, Silver Star and other awards.

Life after War

In June 1946, Andrus was transferred to Fort Sill, Oklahoma, where he was appointed commander of the Field Artillery School. Andrus served until April 1949, when he was transferred to the General Staff in Washington, D.C., where he became Director of the Organization & Training Division.

His last assignment was at Fort Meade, Maryland, where he was appointed deputy commander of the Second United States Army under command of Edward H. Brooks.

In 1951, Andrus received the honorary degree of Doctor of Science from Drexel University in 1951.  Andrus retired from the Army on October 31, 1952.

Andrus died in Washington, D.C. on September 29, 1968 at the age of 77.  He was buried  at Arlington National Cemetery.

Family
He married Marion Eleanor Lightfoot on Feb. 15, 1918.  They had two daughters: Margaret Josephine and Marion.

Summary of Military Career

Decorations

Major General Clift Andrus received numerous military decorations for bravery or distinguished service. Here is his ribbon bar:

Dates of rank

References

External links
Generals of World War II
United States Army Officers 1939–1945

|-

1890 births
1968 deaths
United States Army Field Artillery Branch personnel
United States Army personnel of World War I
United States Army Command and General Staff College alumni
United States Army War College alumni
Naval War College alumni
Burials at Arlington National Cemetery
Recipients of the Distinguished Service Cross (United States)
Recipients of the Distinguished Service Medal (US Army)
Recipients of the Silver Star
Recipients of the Legion of Merit
Recipients of the Soldier's Medal
Chevaliers of the Légion d'honneur
Recipients of the Croix de Guerre 1939–1945 (France)
Recipients of the Military Order of the White Lion
Recipients of the Czechoslovak War Cross
United States Army generals of World War II
United States Army generals